Valentino Vermeulen (born 20 July 2001) is a Dutch footballer who plays as a defender for Willem II.

Club career
On 1 June 2022, it was announced that Vermeulen was joining Borussia Dortmund for the 2022–23 season. Borussia clarified in their announcement that he is assigned to Borussia Dortmund II.

On 13 January 2023, Vermeulen returned to Willem II, the club that he played for as a junior, on a 2.5-year contract.

Career statistics

Club

References

External links
 Career stats & Profile - Voetbal International

2001 births
Living people
Dutch footballers
Footballers from Eindhoven
Association football defenders
Willem II (football club) players
FC Eindhoven players
Eerste Divisie players
Borussia Dortmund II players
Dutch expatriate footballers
Dutch expatriate sportspeople in Germany
Expatriate footballers in Germany